Business Day may refer to:
Business day, a period of the week
BusinessDay, a website of Fairfax Media (Australia, New Zealand)
Business Day (Nigeria), a business/finance newspaper
Business Day (South Africa),a business/finance newspaper
BusinessWorld, a Filipino newspaper originally published as Business Day